Suffolk Rural College is an English further education college in the village of Otley, Suffolk.

The college was founded in 1970 as Otley College of Agriculture and Horticulture. It merged with Ipswich-based Suffolk New College in 2020, having previously been partnered with Easton College in Norfolk.

The college
The college offers full-time courses and apprenticeships in the following curriculum areas:

 Agriculture
 Animal Management
 Arboriculture
 Construction
 Equine Studies
 Fisheries
 Floristry
 Foundation Learning
 Horticulture

Location 
The campus is located in the heart of the countryside and benefits from a range of specialist vocational workshops and outdoor facilities, as well as general college buildings.

The campus consists of:

 A working farm for Agriculture
 Equine facilities
 Floristry workshops
 Commercial Dog Grooming parlour
 Facilities for Arboriculture
 Horticulture greenhouses
 Land-Based Service Engineering workshop
 Construction workshops
 Engineering, Motor Vehicle and HGV workshops
 Foundation Learning areas
 Range of Sports facilities

The Farm 
Suffolk Rural prides itself on maintaining sustainability within their farming facilities, reusing and recycling as many products as possible within their facilities while also operating in the most environmentally friendly ways possible.

On the farm the College have:

 Red-poll cattle. 
 Sheep flock and seasonal lambs.
 Poultry and seasonal chicks.
 Goats. 
 Horses and equine facilities (inside and outdoors).
 Pigs.
 Alpacas.
 Land-based engineering technology, including tractors.
 Arable crops. 
 95 acres of farmland; made up of grassland, mixed cropping, and environmental areas.

In June 2022, the College announced its desire to open a Farm Shop on campus when visited by MP Dan Poulter

Notable alumni 

 Michael Perry (Mr Plant Geek)

References

External links
Suffolk Rural website

Further education colleges in Suffolk
Horticultural organisations based in the United Kingdom